Dyanik Zurakowska (born 22 March 1947) is a Belgian actress. She appeared in more than forty films from 1965 to 1977.

Selected filmography

References

External links 

1947 births
Belgian film actresses
Living people
People from Lubumbashi